Jay Harris Pickett (February 10, 1961 – July 30, 2021) was an American actor.

Early life and education 
Pickett was born in Spokane, Washington, and grew up in Caldwell, Idaho. He received his Bachelor of Arts degree in acting at Boise State University and his Master of Fine Arts in acting from the University of California, Los Angeles and appeared in numerous theatrical productions at both schools.

Career 
Pickett's television appearances include in the miniseries Rags to Riches, and roles on such series as China Beach, Mr. Belvedere, Dragnet, Jake and The Fatman, Days of Our Lives, Perry Mason, and Matlock.

In 1997, Pickett originated the role of Frank Scanlon, a dedicated paramedic and substitute teacher and the complicated older brother of Joe Scanlon, on the ABC Daytime drama Port Charles. In 2006, Pickett substituted for actor Ted King in the role of Lorenzo Alcazar on the soap opera General Hospital, the parent series of Port Charles. In 2007, Pickett rejoined the cast of General Hospital in the recurring role of Detective David Harper.

He enjoyed most sports, including football, basketball, baseball, and skiing. He was also an expert roper and western horse rider.

Personal life 
Pickett and his wife, Elena, resided in California and had three children. He was best friends with former Port Charles co-star Michael Dietz and was godfather to his daughter, Madison.

Pickett died unexpectedly from a heart attack while preparing to film a scene for the film Treasure Valley directed by Travis Mills on a set near Oreana, Idaho, on July 30, 2021, aged 60.

Filmography

Films

Television

References

External links 

1961 births
2021 deaths
20th-century American male actors
21st-century American male actors
American male soap opera actors
American male television actors
Boise State University alumni
Male actors from Idaho
Male actors from Spokane, Washington
People from Caldwell, Idaho
University of California, Los Angeles alumni